Taillebourg is a commune in the Charente-Maritime department in southwestern France.

It is built on a rock, overlooking the river Charente, 9 km downstream from Saintes.

The place was first mentioned as terra Talleburgi in 1267. It was the site of three battles that bear its name: Battle of Taillebourg, on account of its strategically important position as a river crossing. There was also a fourth action, a siege.

The château dominates the town and was the garrison of Louis IX (known as 'Saint Louis'), before the eponymous 1242 battle.

The ancient bridge over the Charente has since been destroyed but there is a long causeway, which spans the surrounding marshes and serves to keep the road open, even during times of flooding.

Population

See also
Communes of the Charente-Maritime department

References

Communes of Charente-Maritime